Production history of plays performed by the Oregon Shakespeare Festival, .

The early years (1930s)
In the early years, OSF only produced works of Shakespeare.

In July 1939, OSF was invited to present their production of The Taming of the Shrew at the Golden Gate International Exposition. The performance was broadcast nationally over NBC Radio. The interest drawn up by the national broadcast may have been the necessary exposure that allowed the Festival to return following World War II.

The post-war years (late 1940s and 1950s)
The festival did not present any productions from 1941 to 1946. This was due to World War II and a fire that burned down the festival's original Elizabethan Theatre.

In 1951, actors from the summer acting company formed the Vining Repertory. This "edition" of the festival was created to present plays in indoor venues that allowed the season to utilize more of the year when winter weather would prohibit outdoor performances. They performed for three seasons in a local venue known as the Lithia Theatre before a fire destroyed the stage, stock, and records. The name "Vining Repertory" was in honor of the brothers who founded the Lithia Theatre and who had died just before the creation of this "sub-company".

The 1960s
The 60s confirmed the demand for an indoor venue that permitted performances in colder months. Vining Rep continued for another year in a new venue: a local movie theatre called the Varsity Theatre with the dressing rooms in a trailer behind the venue. Later in the decade, the festival used the Varsity for matinee performances of Ballad Operas, but were soon able to raise enough money to build a new indoor space: The Angus Bowmer Theatre.

The 1970s
The 1970s began with the first season in the new Angus Bowmer Theatre. In 1977, after being used for company-only play performances and staged readings, the Black Swan Theatre became another venue presenting shows as a part of the main OSF season. The Black Swan was used for more experimental or intimate productions.

The 1980s

The 1990s

The 2000s
The early 2000s saw the decommissioning of the Black Swan Theatre as a venue for the regular season and the construction and opening of the New Theatre that would later be renamed as the Thomas Theatre in 2013. The Black Swan closed at the end of the 2001 season on October 28, and the New Theatre started performances in March 2002.

The decade also saw a change in leadership. In 2007, Libby Appel ended her tenure as the Artistic Director. The 2008 season was the first for Bill Rauch, who became the fifth person to assume the role.

The 2010s
Several theaters underwent name changes for the 2013 season. The New Theatre finally gained a formal name as the Thomas Theatre. The Elizabethan Stage and Allen  were united under one name as the Allen Elizabethan Theatre, thanks to a $3 Million grant from the Paul G. Allen Family Foundation.

In 2014, the Festival announced their Canon in a Decade initiative. In the next ten years, from 2015 to 2024, the Festival would be producing the complete Shakespeare Canon to honor the 80th anniversary of the festival. This project is in progress, and may have been affected by shut downs due to the COVID-19 pandemic.

In August 2019, Bill Rauch left the position of Artistic Director. Nataki Garrett is his successor, and she is the sixth person to hold the position.

The 2020s 

The Festival opened the 2020 season on February 28. On March 11, the COVID-19 pandemic forced the performances and remaining openings of all shows to be cancelled indefinitely. By the end of March, the Festival was hoping to present a smaller season that would open Labor Day weekend. The plan was to present the four shows that had already opened with the addition of Shakespeare's The Tempest in the outdoor Allen Elizabethan Theatre. On May 8, it became apparent that ongoing social distancing restrictions in Oregon would prohibit a fall season and all shows for 2020 were cancelled.

In February 2021, the Festival announced a hybrid season that would allow for flexibility surrounding ongoing social distancing mandates.  The Festival offered month-long streaming access to archive videos of previous shows in the early part of the year on their newly-launched streaming platform, O!. The archive streams included Julius Caesar (2017 season), Manahatta (2018 season), and Snow in Midsummer (2018 season). Also announced were tentative plans for three fully-staged shows to open in the followed by OSF's first ever Christmas show. In later May 2021, the OSF announced they would be proceeding with only one play, Fannie: The Music and Life of Fannie Lou Hamer, a one woman show opening July 1 and playing through mid-October in the outdoor Allen Elizabethan Theatre. Concurrently, the outdoor theatre would also offer performances every Wednesday hosting performing groups typically featured in the Green Show. This press release also re-affirmed their plans for a Christmas show written by three members of their acting company titled It's Christmas, Carol!.

Cumulative Shakespeare canon productions 
A list of the number of times the Oregon Shakespeare Festival has produced each of Shakespeare's plays is available below. It counts only main stage productions produced in Ashland and at OSF Portland.

The Festival has completed the canon of the first folio four times: the first time with Troilus and Cressida in 1958, and the remaining times with Timon of Athens in 1978, 1997, and 2016.

*indicates shows not part of the First Folio canon.

Venues
Allen Elizabethan Theatre (Elizabethan Theatre, Elizabethan Stage)
Angus Bowmer Theatre
Black Swan Theatre
Thomas Theatre (The New Theatre)
Lithia Theatre
Varsity Theatre
Tao House (Danville, California)
Portland Center Stage (OSF Portland)
Kennedy Center

References

External links
The OSF Archive

Shakespeare festivals in the United States
Ashland, Oregon
Theatre companies in Oregon
Theatre company production histories